Diet may refer to:

Food
 Diet (nutrition), the sum of the food consumed by an organism or group
 Dieting, the deliberate selection of food to control body weight or nutrient intake
 Diet food, foods that aid in creating a diet for weight loss or gain
 Healthy diet, the process of helping to maintain or improve overall health

Politics
Diet (assembly), a formal deliberative assembly

Current
 National Diet, Japan's bicameral legislature, in its current form since 1947, composed of the House of Representatives and the House of Councillors
 Landtag, a diet of states and provinces in Germany, Austria, South Tyrol in Italy, and the national parliament of Liechtenstein
 Bundestag (Deutscher Bundestag), the lower house of Germany's Parliament, established in West Germany in 1949, and all of Germany in 1990

Historical
 Diet of Finland, the legislative assembly of the Grand Duchy of Finland from 1809 to 1906
 Diet of Hungary, the legislative assembly of the Kingdom of Hungary from 15th century to 1946
 Imperial Diet (Holy Roman Empire), the imperial assembly of the princes of the Holy Roman Empire until 1806
 Federal Convention (German Confederation), or Confederate Diet (German: Bundesversammlung or Bundestag) was the only central institution of the German Confederation (1815–1848 and 1850–1866)
 Reichstag
 Reichstag (German Empire) (Reichstag), the Diet of the Empire, the legislative assembly of the German Empire, 1871–1917
 Reichstag (Weimar Republic), (Reichstag), the Diet of the Weimar Republic, from 1919 to 1933
 Reichstag (Nazi Germany), (Reichstag), the Diet of Nazi Germany, from 1933 to 1945, a purely ceremonial "parliament" in a totalitarian dictatorship without elections

Television, film, or music
 "Diet", an episode of the Adult Swim animated television series, Aqua Teen Hunger Force
 The Diet (cartoon), a Beetle Bailey animated short
 "Diet", a 2020 single by Peakboy

Other uses

 DIET, an open-source middleware for high-performance computing
 District Institute of Education and Training, in India
DIET, direct electron transfer involving bacterial nanowires in species such as Geobacter

See also

 Diets, a historical name for the Dutch language in general
 Dietsch (disambiguation), distinguishes the southern dialects in the Middle Dutch language